Richard John Charles Rivers Ker (21 July 1822 – 18 December 1890) was an Irish politician and first-class cricketer.

He was a son of David Ker, MP for Athlone 1820-1826 and Downpatrick 1835-1841, and Selina Sarah, daughter of the first Marquess of Londonderry, and the younger brother of David Stewart Ker, the Member of Parliament for Downpatrick, 1841-1847 and 1859-1867 and one of the Members of Parliament for County Down, 1852-1857 He was educated in England at Eton College, before going up to Corpus Christi College, Oxford. While studying at Oxford, he made three appearances in first-class cricket for Oxford University in 1841–2, playing twice against the Marylebone Cricket Club and once in The University Match against Cambridge.

He was elected as a Peelite Conservative Member of Parliament for Downpatrick in 1847, resigning through appointment as Steward of the Chiltern Hundreds on 1 August 1851. He was again elected in an 1857 by-election for the same seat, but did not stand in the 1859 general election. Ker died in England at South Kensington in December 1890.

References

 

1822 births
1890 deaths
People from Battersea
People educated at Eton College
Alumni of Corpus Christi College, Oxford
Irish cricketers
Oxford University cricketers
Members of the Parliament of the United Kingdom for County Down constituencies (1801–1922)
UK MPs 1847–1852
UK MPs 1857–1859
Irish Conservative Party MPs